The men's speed competition in sport climbing at the 2013 World Games took place on 3 August 2013 at the Velodrome Exterior in Cali, Colombia.

Competition format
A total of 18 athletes entered the competition. In qualification every athlete has 2 runs, best time counts. Top 8 climbers qualify to main competition.

Results

Qualifications

Competition bracket

References 

 
2013 World Games